The 2019 Dow Tennis Classic was a professional tennis tournament played on indoor hard courts. It was the twenty-fifth edition of the tournament and was part of the 2019 ITF Women's World Tennis Tour. It took place in Midland, United States, on 28 January–3 February 2019.

Singles main draw entrants

Seeds 

 1 Rankings as of 14 January 2019.

Other entrants 
The following players received a wildcard into the singles main draw:
  Cori Gauff
  Ashley Kratzer
  Caty McNally
  Grace Min

The following player received entry using a protected ranking:
  Olga Govortsova

The following players received entry from the qualifying draw:
  Robin Anderson
  Jovana Jakšić
  Ann Li
  Chihiro Muramatsu
  Urszula Radwańska
  Valeria Savinykh

Champions

Singles

 Caty McNally def.  Jessica Pegula, 6–2, 6–4

Doubles
 
 Olga Govortsova /  Valeria Savinykh def.  Cori Gauff /  Ann Li, 6–4, 6–0

External links 
 Official website
 2019 Dow Tennis Classic at ITFtennis.com

2019 ITF Women's World Tennis Tour
2019 in American tennis
Tennis tournaments in the United States